Kuleshov is a rural locality (a khutor) in Alexeyevsky District, Belgorod Oblast, Russia.

Demographics
The population was 5 as of 2010. There is 1 street.

Geography 
Kuleshov is located 26 km southeast of Alexeyevka (the district's administrative centre) by road. Kirichenkov is the nearest rural locality.

References 

Rural localities in Alexeyevsky District, Belgorod Oblast
Biryuchensky Uyezd